The Don Rhodes Mining and Transport Museum is a public park in Port Hedland, Western Australia, with an open-air display of retired mining machinery and railway rollingstock.

Located on Wilson Street, which links the town with the Great Northern Highway and North West Coastal Highway, the museum faces Nelson Point Yard, the northern terminus of the Mount Newman railway.

History
Don Rhodes, after whom the museum is named, was a pioneer of the mining and transport industries in the Pilbara region, and was responsible for commissioning the first modern Australian built roadtrain.

While working manganese leases, Rhodes initially used various English made trucks, but these could not cope with the task.  He therefore arranged for his chief engineer, Harold Ridley, to design and build the 70 ton Rhodes Ridley roadtrain, a rig that, when it was completed in 1958, was capable of hauling the company's 100 ton crushing plants.

However, the government of the day ultimately refused to license the Rhodes Ridley or even allow it to operate on gazetted roads.  It had done barely  by the time it was forced to retire.

Exhibits
Three standard gauge locomotives are on display in the centre of the museum.  Each of them previously operated on one or both of the mining railways that terminate at Port Hedland (the Goldsworthy railway and the Mount Newman railway).

See also

Silver Star Cafe (Port Hedland)

References

Notes

Further reading

External links

Donovan Francis Duncan RHODES – an illustrated biography of Don Rhodes

Mining museums in Australia
Port Hedland, Western Australia
Railway museums in Western Australia